Zingela is a genus of flowering plant in the family Asparagaceae. It has only one currently accepted species, Zingela pooleyorum, native to KwaZulu-Natal in South Africa. It was previously misidentified as specimens of Drimia indica.

References

Scilloideae
Monotypic Asparagaceae genera
Endemic flora of South Africa
Plants described in 2018